The Swiftcurrent Fire Lookout in Glacier National Park is significant as one of a chain of staffed fire lookout posts within the park. The low two-story timber-construction structure with a gabled roof was built in 1936. Its detailing is reminiscent of the Swiss Chalet style of the nearby Many Glacier Hotel. The design is modified from standard U.S. Forest Service plans. The Swiftcurrent lookout was listed on the National Register of Historic Places in 1986, and it is also listed on the National Historic Lookout Register.

References

Towers completed in 1936
Rustic architecture in Montana
Fire lookout towers on the National Register of Historic Places in Montana
National Register of Historic Places in Glacier County, Montana
1936 establishments in Montana
National Register of Historic Places in Glacier National Park
Swiss Chalet Revival architecture